Jacqueline is a female given name.

Origins 

Jacqueline comes from French, as the feminine form of Jacques (English James). Jacques originated from 'Jacob', which is derived from the Hebrew meaning 'may God protect' or 'supplanter'.

Supplanter refers to a person who replaces someone or a thing of lesser value, and this Hebrew meaning refers to Jacob's supplanting Esau as recorded in the Hebrew Bible. 'May God protect' has a more positive connotation and is, therefore, the preferred meaning for the name.

Jacqueline was first used in 17th century England.

Variant and diminutive forms
It has spelling variations and many variants in both spelling and pronunciation have come into use, such as Jacquelyn, Jacquelin, Jackeline, Jackielyn, Jacklyn, Jaquelin, and Jaclyn. The diminutive for Jacqueline is Jacquie, Jackie, Jacque or Jacqui, which also has many variants.

Popularity 

Jacqueline is a very popular female first name, used in the United States, Canada, England, France, Australia, South Africa and elsewhere.

One of the most famous persons to bear the name in the twentieth century is Jacqueline Kennedy Onassis, née Jacqueline Lee Bouvier, often referred to as Jackie Kennedy following her marriage to U.S. President John F. Kennedy from 1953 to 1963.

Transliterations

 Amharic: ጃክሊን (Jakilīni)
 Arabic: جاكلين 
 Armenian: Ժագլին, Ժաքլինը (Zhak’liny)
 Bangla: জ্যাকুলিন (Jyākulina)
 Bulgarian: Жаклин, Zhaklina
 Simplified Chinese: Jiékuílín, 杰奎琳
 Traditional Chinese: Jiékuílín, 賈桂琳
 Cantonese: 積琦蓮
 Croatian: Jaklina
 Czech: Jakubka, Jakuba
 Danish: Jacobine, Bine, Iben
 Dutch: Jacoba, Jacobina, Jacobine, Coba, Jacomina
 French: Jacquette, Jacquetta, Jacqui, Jacquine, Jaquette
 Galician: Xaquelina
 Georgian: ჟაკლინ (Zhaklin)
 Greek: Iakovina (Ιακωβινα)
 Gujarati: Jēkvēlina (જેક્વેલિન)
 Hebrew: ז'קלין, ג'קי
 Hindi: Jaikalina, जैकलिन
 Hungarian: Zsaklin
 Italian: Giachetta, Giacomina, Giacoma
 Irish: Séamaisíona, Seacailín, Siacailín
 
 Kannada: Jākvelin, ಜಾಕ್ವೆಲಿನ್
 Korean: Jaekeullin, 재클린
 Latin: Iacoba
 Lithuanian: Žaklina
 Macedonian: Жаклина (Quaklin)
 Malayalam: ജാക്വലിൻ (Jākvalin)
 Marathi: जॅकलिन (Jĕkalina)
 Mongolian: Жаклин (Jaklin)
 Nepali: जैकलिन (Jaikalina)
 Polish: Jakubina, Żaklina, Żaklin
 Persian: ژاکلین
 Portuguese: Jaqueline
 Punjabi: Jaikalīna, ਜੈਕਲੀਨ
 Russian: Zhaklin, Яковина, Якубина, Жаклин
 Serbian: Жаклина, Žaklin
 Scottish: Jamesina
 Spanish: Jacoba
 Tamil: Jākkuliṉ, ஜாக்குலின், Jākki ஜாக்கி
 Telugu: Jākvelin, జాక్వెలిన్, Jākī జాకీ
 Thai: Cæ̆kh ke x līn, แจ๊คเกอลีน
 Ukrainian: Zhaklin, Жаклін
 Welsh: Jacelin
 Yiddish: Jaklin, דזשאַקלין, Jackye דזשאַקקיע

Notable people

Television, stage, and film 
 Jacqueline Beer, former actress and present chair of the Board of Directors of the Thor Heyerdahl Research Centre
 Jacqueline Bisset (born 1944), British actress
 Jacqueline Boatswain (born 1962), English actress
 Jacqueline Bracamontes, Mexican actress
 Jackie Brambles, British television presenter
 Jacqueline Brookes, American stage actress
 Jacqueline Fernandez, Bahraini–Sri Lankan actress and model
 Jacqueline Ellen Last O'Neil Henderson, Australian radio host known as "Jackie O"
 Jacqueline Emerson, American actress
 Jacqueline Hennessy, Canadian actress and journalist
 Jacqueline Hill, British actress
 Jacqueline Jossa, English actress
 Jacqueline Kim, Korean-American actress best known for the role of Lao Ma in the television series Xena: Warrior Princess
 Jacqueline Leonard, Scottish actress
 Jacqueline Logan, American silent film actress
 Jacqueline McKenzie, Australian actress
 Jacquelyn Mills, Canadian documentary filmmaker
 Jacqueline Obradors, American actress
 Jacqueline Pagnol, French actress
 Jacqueline Pearce, British actress
 Jacqueline Pillon, voice actress best known for the role of Matthew in the PBS cartoon series CyberChase
 Jacqueline Royaards-Sandberg (1876–1976), Dutch actress
 Jacqueline Scott (1931–2020), American actress
 Jaclyn Smith, American actress and businesswoman
 Jacqueline Toboni, American actress
 Jacqueline Wu, Hong Kong actress
 Jacqueline (Jackée) Harry, American actress

Sports 
 Jacqueline Batteast, US basketball player
 Jackie Silva, Brazilian beach volleyball player
 Jackie Gayda, American semi-retired professional wrestler
 Jackie Joyner-Kersee, American retired track and field athlete
 Jacqueline Moore, American semi-retired professional wrestler
 Jacqueline Perkins (born 1965), Australian long-distance runner
 Jacquie Phelan, American professional mountain bike champion
 Jacqueline Pusey (born 1959), Jamaican sprint athlete
 Jacqueline Todten (born 1954), German javelin thrower

Literature 
 Jacqueline Bishop, Jamaican writer, visual artist and photographer
 Jacqueline Briskin, writer
 Jacqueline "Jackie" French, Australian children's writer
 Jacqueline Jackson, author and peace activist
 Jacqueline Susann, writer
 Jacqueline Wilson, writer
 Jacqueline Woodson, writer

Music 
 Jacqueline Boyer, singer
 Jacqueline "Jacky" Clark Chisholm, singer
 Jacqueline du Pré, British cellist
 Jacqueline Marie "Jackie" Evancho, Classical crossover singer
 Jacqueline Govaert, Dutch singer
 Jacqueline Taïeb, French singer

Science 
 Jacqueline Barton (born 1952), American chemist
 Jacqueline Beggs (born 1962), New Zealand entomologist and ecologist
 Jacqueline Chen, American applied mathematician and mechanical engineer
 Jacqueline Dewar, American mathematician 
 Jacqueline McGlade (born 1955), British-born Canadian environmental scientist
 Jacqueline Noonan (1928–2020), American pediatric cardiologist

Other
 Jacqueline, Countess of Hainaut (1401–1436)
 Jacqueline Felice de Almania, Italian physician
 Jacqueline Auriol, (1917–2000), French aviator
 Jacqueline Bishop, Jamaican writer, visual artist and photographer
 Jacqueline Bracamontes, beauty pageant titleholder
 Jacqueline Cochran (1906–1980), American aviator and business executive, first woman pilot to break the sound barrier and head of the  Women Airforce Service Pilots for part of World War II
 Jacqueline Kennedy Onassis, (1929–1994), widow of US President John F. Kennedy and Aristotle Onassis
 Jacqueline Aguilera Marcano, 1995 Miss World representative of Venezuela
 Jacqueline Perkins (diplomat), British diplomat and ambassador
 Jacqueline Saburido, victim and survivor of a high-profile drunk-driving accident
 Jacqui Smith (born 1962), British politician, former Home Secretary
 Jackie Stallone (1921–2020), American astrologer, mother of actor Sylvester Stallone and singer Frank Stallone
 Jacqueline Thomas, victim in a high-profile 1960s English murder case
 Jacqueline Grennan Wexler, American Roman Catholic nun and university president

Fictional characters 
 Jacqueline Ingrid Bouvier, TV cartoon character on The Simpsons
 Jacqueline Beulah Burkhart, character from That '70s Show
 Jacqueline "Jacqui" Bernadette McQueen, character from the long-running soap opera Hollyoaks
 Jacqueline Natla, main antagonist and final boss from Tomb Raider video games
 Jacqueline Andrea Suzette Tyler, a character from the 2005 Doctor Who television series
 Jacqueline Payne Marone, character from The Bold and the Beautiful
 Jackie Wilcox, character from the TV series Heroes
 Jacqueline De Bellefort (De Severac in the stage version), character from Agatha Christie's novel Death on the Nile 
 Jacqueline Barrett, character from Jack & Jill
 Jacqueline Falsworth-Crichton, comic book character
Jacqueline de Ghent, character from Ever After

See also 
 Jacqui
 Jackie
 Jackeline
 Jaclyn

References

External links 
 Meaning of Jacqueline on Thinkbabynames.com
 Meaning of Jacqueline on Babynameworld.com 
 Meaning of Jacqueline on BabyNamer.com
 Meaning of Jacqueline on Baby Names Pedia
 Meaning of Jacqueline on NaamIsm

Dutch feminine given names
English feminine given names
French feminine given names
Feminine given names
Irish feminine given names

fr:Jacqueline
ms:Jacqueline
ja:ジャクリーン
pl:Żaklina